Kim Charlott Kärnfalk Löwstedt (born 1 November 1974 in Uddevalla, Sweden) is a Swedish singer. Together with Nina Inhammar she sang in the duo Nina & Kim; they competed in Melodifestivalen 2004 with the song En gång för alla and the same year they released their album Bortom tid och rum. They were also two of the members of the band Friends (1999–2002).

In 2008, her autobiography Mamma, mormor och jag was released.

References

External links
Kim Kärnfalk's blog
Chat with Kim Kärnfalk on Sveriges Radio

Living people
People from Uddevalla Municipality
1974 births
21st-century Swedish singers
21st-century Swedish women singers
Melodifestivalen contestants of 2004
Melodifestivalen contestants of 2002
Melodifestivalen contestants of 2001
Melodifestivalen contestants of 2000